The 2000 AFC Youth Championship was held between November 12 and 26 in Iran. It was won by Iraq 2–1 over Japan.

Participants

 Iran (qualified as hosts)

The teams that reached the semi-final qualified for the 2001 FIFA World Youth Championship in Argentina.

Venues 
All Matches in Shahid Shiroudi Stadium, Tehran.

Group stage
The original draw had Kuwait in the same group as Iraq. Kuwait protested that they did not want to be in Iraq's group due to political tensions, so the AFC did a re-draw to separate Iraq and Kuwait.

Group A

Group B

Knockout stage

Semi-finals

Third place match

Final

Winners

Qualification to World Youth Championship
The following teams qualified for the 2001 FIFA World Youth Championship.

References

External links
 Details on RSSF

 
2000
Youth
2000
2000 in youth association football